The Chartwell Mansion is a Chateauesque mansion in Bel-Air, California. Built in 1933, it is best known for its role as the Clampett family home in the 1960s television sitcom  The Beverly Hillbillies.  It was the most expensive home for sale in the United States in 2018.

History
The house was designed by Sumner Spaulding in 1933 in the style of a French chateau. It was built for engineer and contractor Lynn Atkinson, who commissioned the property for his wife. She found it "pretentious", so the couple never lived there. The house, located on 10 acres (4 hectares), with gardens designed by Henri Samuel, later was owned by Arnold Kirkeby and then Jerry Perenchio.

In 2019, the mansion was reported to have been sold to Lachlan Murdoch for about $150 million, which was the highest sale price for any house in California history.

See also 
 List of largest houses in the Los Angeles metropolitan area
 List of largest houses in the United States

References 

Houses in Los Angeles
Houses completed in 1933